David Wakeling (born 19 February 1956) is an English singer, songwriter and musician, best known for his work with the band the Beat (known in North America as the English Beat) and General Public.

Career
Wakeling began his professional career when he formed the band, the Beat. The debut studio album by the Beat included the singles "I Just Can't Stop It", "Mirror in the Bathroom", "Hands Off...She's Mine" and "Can't Get Used to Losing You", all of which charted within the Top 10 on the UK Singles Chart. The band also had UK hits from the studio albums Wha'ppen? (1981) and Special Beat Service (1982).

Wakeling then formed General Public with Ranking Roger in 1984, and they released their debut studio album All the Rage that year. He also recorded two other studio albums with General Public, Hand to Mouth (1986) and Rub It Better (1995), shortly after which the band disbanded.

He then produced the soundtrack for the John Hughes romantic comedy film She's Having a Baby (1988), in which he also recorded the title track.

In 1991, Wakeling released his sole solo studio album No Warning, on I.R.S. Records and has lived in California for a number of years. He regularly performs as the English Beat in North America, and has recorded two new songs that feature in the Scooby-Doo! Mystery Incorporated episode "Dance of the Undead" which debuted in March 2013."

Throughout his career, Wakeling has mainly used a left handed Vox Teardrop guitar aka: Vox Mark III, he was initially drawn to the guitar as his favourite artist and guitarist Brian Jones of the Rolling Stones used one.  "I wanted to be him and I used to play my cricket bat or my tennis racket and pretend it was a teardrop in the mirror when my mom had gone out shopping. I even bought a blond wig from a second-hand shop and I cut it out into a bob. As soon as I heard the front door I would think "Great, she’s gone". I would take out the wig, the cricket bat and play in front of the mirror." On 8 April 2006, he donated his Vox of 26 years to the Rock and Roll Hall of Fame.

Personal life
Wakeling is divorced, with two children, Max and Chloe. He resides in the San Fernando Valley, California. 

In 1985, Wakeling announced in a press interview with Mother Jones magazine that he was bisexual.

Discography
 No Warning (1991 I.R.S. Records)

Side one
 "I Want More" (Dave Wakeling, Parthenon Huxley) – 4:16
 "No Warning" (Wakeling, Mark Goldenberg) – 	4:53
 "Remember in the Dark" (Wakeling) – 5:23
 "Every Time You Look at Me That Way" (Wakeling) – 4:12
 "Sensation" (Wakeling, Mickey Billingham, Goldenberg) – 4:04

Side two
"Freedom Fighter" (Wakeling, Billingham) – 5:53
 "One + One + One" (Wakeling, Goldenberg) – 5:15
 "Sex with You" (Wakeling) – 3:32
 "I'm Not Ready" (Wakeling, Billingham) – 3:58
 "She's Having a Baby" (Wakeling, Ian Ritchie) – 3:44

Produced by Mark Goldenberg (tracks 1–9) and Steve Levine ("She's Having a Baby")

References

 1. The Rolling Stone Encyclopedia of Rock and Roll, Third Edition (Fireside, 2001)
 2. The Billboard Book of Top 40 Hits, 8th Edition (Billboard Books, 2004)

External links 

 Dave Wakeling's website
 
 
 
 

1956 births
20th-century English musicians
20th-century British male singers
21st-century English musicians
21st-century British male singers
21st-century English LGBT people
Bisexual musicians
British expatriates in the United States
English male guitarists
English male singers
English new wave musicians
English rock guitarists
General Public members
British LGBT musicians
British LGBT singers
Living people
Male new wave singers
Musicians from Birmingham, West Midlands
People educated at King Edward VI Camp Hill School for Boys
The Beat (British band) members
British ska musicians